Anadromidae is an extinct family of gastropods in the clade Eupulmonata (according to taxonomy of the Gastropoda by Bouchet & Rocroi, 2005).

Taxonomy 
The family Anadromidae is classified within the informal group Sigmurethra, itself belonging to the clade Stylommatophora within the clade Eupulmonata (according to taxonomy of the Gastropoda by Bouchet & Rocroi, 2005).

The family Anadromidae consists of the following subfamilies:

Genera 
Anadromus

Lychnus

Nicolasia

References